The 1983–84 Drexel Dragons men's basketball team represented Drexel University  during the 1983–84 NCAA Division I men's basketball season. The Dragons, led by 7th year head coach Eddie Burke, played their home games at the Daskalakis Athletic Center and were members of the East Coast Conference (ECC).

The team finished the season 17–12, and finished in 3rd place in the ECC in the regular season.

Roster

Schedule

|-
!colspan=9 style="background:#F8B800; color:#002663;"| Regular season
|-

|-
!colspan=12 style="background:#FFC600; color:#07294D;"| ECC Tournament
|-

Awards
Richard Congo
ECC Player of the Year
ECC All-Conference First Team

Michael Mitchell
ECC All-Conference Second Team

References

Drexel Dragons men's basketball seasons
Drexel
1983 in sports in Pennsylvania
1984 in sports in Pennsylvania